Brande station is a railway station serving the railway town of Brande in Central Jutland, Denmark.

Brande station is located on the Vejle-Holstebro railway line. The station opened in 1914 with the opening of the Give-Herning section of the Vejle-Holstebro Line. The station building was designed by the Danish architect Heinrich Wenck. The stations offers direct InterCityLyn services to Copenhagen and Struer operated by the railway company DSB as well as regional train services to Vejle, Herning and Struer operated by Arriva.

See also
 List of railway stations in Denmark

References

Citations

Bibliography

External links

 Banedanmark – government agency responsible for maintenance and traffic control of most of the Danish railway network
 DSB – largest Danish train operating company
 Arriva – British multinational public transport company operating bus and train services in Denmark
 Danske Jernbaner – website with information on railway history in Denmark

Railway stations opened in 1914
Railway stations in the Central Denmark Region
1914 establishments in Denmark
Heinrich Wenck railway stations
Railway stations in Denmark opened in the 20th century